James Michael Jackson, known as Mike Jackson (born 20 August 1953) is a Republican former member of the Texas Senate representing the 11th District. He was also the President pro tempore of the Texas Senate, before running the United States House of Representatives in 2012. In this capacity, he was an acting governor of Texas while Governor Rick Perry campaigned for U.S. President and Lieutenant Governor David Dewhurst was on holiday or campaigned for Perry.

Education
Jackson attended Louisiana State University in Baton Rouge and Louisiana Tech University in Ruston.

Political experience
Jackson has had the following political experience:
Candidate, United States House of Representatives of Texas' 36th congressional district, 2012
Texas State Senator, 1999–2013
Texas State Representative, 1989-1999

Most recent legislative committees
Jackson has been a member of the following committees:
Agriculture and Rural Affairs
Business and Commerce
Committee of the Whole Senate
Economic Development (Chair)
Natural Resources
State Affairs

Caucuses/Non-Legislative committees
Mike Jackson was a member of the following committees:
Member, Deer Park Community Advisory Council
Texas Delegate, Energy Council
Member, Environment Committee
Member, La Porte Mayor's Advisory Committee
Member, Lottery Commission
Member, Redistricting and Elections Committee
Member, Sunset Advisory Commission
Co-Chair, Texas Conservative Coalition's Task Force on Transportation
Member, Texas Windstorm Insurance Legislative Oversight Board
Workers Compensation Commission

Professional experience
Mike Jackson has had the following professional experience:
President, Force Corporation
Industrial Construction and Maintenance

Election history
Senate election history of Jackson.

Most recent election

2004

Previous elections

2002

1998

References

External links
Senate of Texas - Senator Mike Jackson official TX Senate website
Senator Jackson's Campaign Website
Project Vote Smart - Senator Mike Jackson (TX) profile
Follow the Money - Mike Jackson
2006 2004 1998 campaign contributions

1953 births
Living people
Businesspeople from Texas
Politicians from Baton Rouge, Louisiana
People from Harris County, Texas
Republican Party Texas state senators
Presidents pro tempore of the Texas Senate
Republican Party members of the Texas House of Representatives
21st-century American politicians
Louisiana State University alumni
Louisiana Tech University alumni